The 2010–11 season was the 109th season of competitive football in Italy.

Promotions and relegations (pre-season)
Teams promoted to Serie A
Lecce
Cesena
Brescia

Teams relegated from Serie A
Atalanta
Siena
Livorno

Teams promoted to Serie B
Novara
Pescara
Portogruaro
Varese

Teams relegated from Serie B
Ancona
Mantova
Gallipoli
Salernitana

Honours

Italy national football team

Euro 2012 qualification

Friendlies

Italian club's performance in Europe
These are the results of the Italian teams in European competitions during the 2010–11 season. (Italian team score displayed first)

* For group games in Champions League or Europa League, score in home game is displayed
** For group games in Champions League or Europa League, score in away game is displayed

References

 
Seasons in Italian football
2010 in Italian sport
2010 in association football
2011 in Italian sport
2011 in association football